The ECCW Women's Championship (formerly SuperGirls Championship or the NWA SuperGirls Championship) is currently the women's professional wrestling championship of Elite Canadian Championship Wrestling, a wrestling promotion in British Columbia, Canada. The title was first awarded on June 24, 2005 in an attempt to generate interest for SuperGirls Wrestling, a women's wrestling spinoff of ECCW. Rebecca Knox became the first champion by defeating Miss Chevius. The title has been defended in several different promotions, including some promotions in Japan. During Nicole Matthews' near-year-long title reign in 2011, the title was renamed the ECCW Women's Championship.

Title history

Combined reigns 

See also
List of National Wrestling Alliance championships
Elite Canadian Championship Wrestling

References

External links
ECCW Women's Championship

Women's professional wrestling championships
Elite Canadian Championship Wrestling championships